Slavomir is a masculine given name. It may refer to:

 Slavomir of Moravia, medieval duke
 Slavomir Miletić, Yugoslav sculptor from Bosnia and Herzegovina, now living in the Netherlands
 Slavomir Miklovš, Croatian cleric
 Slavomir, Obotrites prince

See also
 Slavomír
 Sławomir

Slavic masculine given names
Serbian masculine given names